Gertrude Aretz née Kuntze-Dolton (1889–1938) was a German historian and publisher. She was married first to the historian Friedrich Max Kircheisen and later to the publisher Paul Aretz. In 1927 she edited the memoirs of Auguste Charlotte von Kielmannsegge (1777–1863).

Works
 Die Frauen um Napoleon, München, Leipzig, G. Müller, 1912. Translated by Cedar and Eden Paul as Napoleon and his women friends 1927.

References

External links

1889 births
1938 deaths
Place of birth missing
20th-century German historians
German women historians
20th-century German women writers